Sweet Soulful Music, released in August 2006, was Andy Fairweather Low's first solo album in twenty six years. It reunited Low with producer Glyn Johns.

Track listing
All tracks composed by Andy Fairweather Low; except where indicated 
 "One More Rocket"
 "Hymn 4 My Soul"
 "What'd You Take Me to Be"
 "Ashes and Diamonds"
 "Bible Black Starless Sky"
 "Don't Stand"
 "Life Ain't No Competition"
 "Zazzy"
 "Low Rider"
 "Unbroken Love"
 "I Don't Need"
 "Sweet Soulful Music"
 "Life Is Good"
 "When I Grow Too Old to Dream" (Oscar Hammerstein II, Sigmund Romberg)

Personnel
Andy Fairweather Low - vocals, guitar, ukulele, mandolin, harmonica 
Dave Bronze - bass
Henry Spinetti - drums, percussion
John "Rabbit" Bundrick - organ, piano
Katie Kissoon, Carol Kenyon, P. P. Arnold - backing vocals

References

2006 albums
Andy Fairweather Low albums
Albums produced by Glyn Johns